The Field Elm cultivar Ulmus minor 'Goodyeri', commonly known as 'Goodyer's Elm', was discovered by John Goodyer in 1624 at Pennington near the Hampshire coast between Lymington and Christchurch.
No old specimens are known to survive, but the tree is perpetuated by numerous root suckers, notably in the lanes about the Alice Lisle public house in the New Forest hamlet of Rockford. The tree has suffered misidentification in the centuries since its discovery, firstly by Philip Miller in his 'Gardeners' Dictionary' of 1731, and later in the early 20th century by Augustine Henry and Marcus Woodward, who both confused the tree with Plot Elm, whose centre of distribution is in the East Midlands, some 200 miles away and of completely different appearance. 

Augustin Ley prepared a herbarium specimen from Goodyer's Elm (without using that name) near Lymington in 1882, calling the trees just Ulmus glabra Mill.. Melville rediscovered Goodyer's Elm in 1937, publishing an account of it in 1938 and describing it as a form of Cornish Elm.

Synonymy
 Ulmus stricta var. goodyeri Melville
 Ulmus minor subsp. angustifolia var. goodyeri  Richens

Description
The tree is chiefly distinguished by its short bole and low, spreading branches, quite unlike any other British elm. In other respects, notably its small leaves <3 cm long by 1.5 cm wide, the tree is very similar to Cornish Elm Ulmus minor 'Stricta'.

Pests and diseases
Goodyer's Elm is very susceptible to Dutch elm disease.

Cultivation
The tree is not known to be in cultivation in the UK, with the exceptions of two specimens introduced to arboreta 2012–16 (see 'Accessions'), nor is it known to have been introduced to continental Europe, North America or Australasia.

Notable trees
A small but sexually mature tree survives beneath an oak near the Alice Lisle public house at Rockford, its trunk severely arched by its search for light.

Accessions

Europe
Grange Farm Arboretum, Sutton St James, Spalding, Lincolnshire, UK. As U. minor subsp. angustifolia var. goodyeri. Acc. no. 1081.
Sir Harold Hillier Gardens, Romsey, Hants., UK. Acc. no. 2016.0400

References

External links
  Sheet labelled U. cornubiensis Weston var. Goodyeri (Melville) from Pennington, Hampshire, 1937 (leaves)
  Sheet labelled U. stricta var. Goodyeri (Melville) from Pennington, Hampshire, 1938 (flowers and leaves) 
  Sheet labelled U. stricta Lindl. var. Goodyeri, from Bashley, Hampshire (samarae)
  Sheet labelled U. stricta Lindl. var. Goodyeri, from Bashley, Hampshire (leaves)
  Sheet labelled U. stricta Lindl. var. Goodyeri, from Bashley, Hampshire
  Sheet labelled U. stricta Lindl. var. Goodyeri, from Bashley, Hampshire
  Sheet labelled U. stricta Lindl. var. Goodyeri, from Bashley, Hampshire
  Sheet labelled U. stricta Lindl. var. Goodyeri, from Bashley, Hampshire
  Sheet labelled U. stricta Lindl. var. Goodyeri, from Bashley, Hampshire

Field elm cultivar
Flora of Great Britain
Trees of Europe
Ulmus articles with images
Ulmus